An armoured flight deck is an aircraft carrier flight deck that incorporates substantial armour in its design.

Comparison is often made between the carrier designs of the Royal Navy (RN) and the United States Navy (USN). The Illustrious class followed the Yorktown but preceded the Essex, while the Implacable-class design predated the Essex but these ships were completed after the lead ships of the Essex class. The remainder of the IJN carrier force during World War II had unarmoured flight decks just like the Yorktown and Essex classes of the USN.

Design
In choosing the best design for their carriers, the British had to consider the advantages and disadvantages of hangar design. There was a choice between open or closed hangar and the position of the armour. The placing of the strongest deck affected the strength of the hull. The further apart the deck and the keel, the stronger the design. If the flight deck was placed above the main deck then it had to be built to allow for movement with expansion sections. A closed hangar design was the strongest structurally and made for a lighter hull. The RN carried this concept one step further and designed the armoured flight deck to also act as the strength deck without any underlying plating, thus achieving an armoured flight deck on the lowest possible displacement.

The carriers that were built with armoured decks fall into two distinct types – those with armour at the flight deck level protecting the hangar and those that only had armour for the lower levels of the ship, typically the hangar deck. The different thickness of armour, and how they were distributed, are described in the table below.

Theory
Armour at the flight deck level would protect the hangar deck and the aircraft stored there from most bombs. The armour of the Illustrious class was intended to protect against 1,000 pound bombs. In the Illustrious class, the armoured flight deck extended for about two-thirds of the length of the ship, bounded by the two aircraft lifts (which were without the armour). The deck was closed by  armoured sides and bulkheads, forming an armoured box. The bulkheads had sliding armoured portals to allow access between the hangar and the aircraft lift. There were  lateral strakes of main deck armour that extended from the base of the hangar side-wall to the top of the main side belt. The latter protected the machinery, magazines and aircraft fuel and weaponry stores. The RN's closed and armoured hangars were capable of being environmentally sealed for protection against chemical weapon attack. The armoured design meant that it would have to be attacked with Armour Piercing (AP) bombs, which have much less blast effect than higher-capacity General Purpose (GP) bombs carrying about twice the explosive amount. GP bombs also caused severe hull damage if they exploded in the water close to the hull; AP bombs, much less so.

The USN open hangar design allowed large numbers of aircraft to be warmed up while inside, theoretically reducing the time required to range and launch a strike, but storage of fuelled and armed aircraft in an unarmoured hangar was extremely dangerous:

During the war, the British fitted immersion heaters to the oil tanks of their aircraft so minimal warm-up was required when they reached the flight deck.

American carriers after the Lexington-class, and the earlier Japanese carriers, had their armour placed at the hangar deck, essentially treating the hangar spaces and flight deck as superstructure – making these areas very vulnerable to the blast from GP bombs and other explosions, which in turn caused massive casualties in comparison to RN designs. A bomb that struck the flight deck would likely penetrate and explode in the hangar deck, but the armour there could still protect the ship's vitals – including the engine spaces and fuel storage. The flight deck could also possibly fuze light bombs prematurely, which would reduce the chance of them going through the hangar deck. Such a design allowed for larger, open-sided hangar bays (improving ventilation but making the ship very vulnerable to chemical weapon attack) and the installation of deck-edge elevators. USN carriers with hangar deck armour only usually had wooden decking over thin mild steel flight decks which were easy to repair.

Aviation fuel delivery and stowage systems were extremely vulnerable. The Royal Navy stowed aviation fuel in cylindrical tanks, that in turn were surrounded by seawater. RN aviation fuel lines were purged with carbon dioxide when not in use. The USN used a similar system, which was further improved after the two navies began exchanging information in 1940. Pre-war USN and IJN carrier designs used a fuel stowage system which was not as secure as that used by the RN, but allowed for much greater stowage capacity. Several USN and IJN carriers were lost due to aviation gas fume explosions.

Doctrine and design
The Royal Navy had to be ready to fight a war in the confines of the North Sea and Mediterranean Sea, under the umbrella of land-based enemy air forces. The Royal Navy, with its extensive network of bases and colonies in the Pacific Ocean, had also to be ready to fight in the vast expanses of the Pacific, as did the USN and the IJN, but the USN and IJN did not have to worry about operating in the Mediterranean. The differences in construction were determined by doctrine that was largely driven by the different approaches to the same tactical problem: How to destroy the enemy's aircraft carriers while surviving the inevitable counter strike. Prior to WWII the RN and USN both recognised that the dive bomber could disable the flight decks of enemy aircraft carriers:

The RN was thus faced with designing a carrier that would be survivable under the conditions to be expected in the Atlantic, Mediterranean, and Pacific Oceans, and before the development of effective naval radar; these conflicting demands resulted in the development of aircraft carriers whose decks were armoured against 500 lb armour piercing bombs and 1000 lb general-purpose bombs. The RN considered that an unarmoured carrier would be unlikely to be able fly off more than one deck load of strike aircraft prior to being attacked, so the armoured flight deck carriers accepted a reduction in hangar capacity to the equivalent to one deck load of aircraft. USN, IJN, and some RN Fleet carriers such as Ark Royal had sufficient aircraft capacity to allow for two ranges, each equal to a full deck load of strike aircraft. The RN and IJN limited their aircraft carrier's aircraft capacity to the capacity of their hangars, and struck down all aircraft between operations. The USN, typically, used a permanent deck park to augment the capacity of their aircraft carrier's hangars. The use of a permanent deck park appeared to give USN carriers a much larger aircraft capacity than contemporary RN armoured flight deck carriers. The flight deck armour also reduced the length of the flight deck, reducing the maximum aircraft capacity of the armoured flight deck carrier, but the largest part of the disparity between RN and USN carriers in aircraft capacity was due to the use of a permanent deck park on USN carriers.

The Royal Navy also had the disadvantage that they entered into World War II with the Royal Navy being pitted against large, land based, air-forces whose aircraft also had superior performance to all existing naval aircraft, while the RAF's increased demand for high performance land based aircraft, after the Fall of France, actually reduced the production and development of Fleet Air Arm aircraft. On the other hand, the RN rapidly introduced new technologies, such as radar, which enhanced the defensive capability of aircraft carriers. The RN thus had to develop new operational doctrines during the war. The USN, in contrast, was able to benefit from technology transfers from the UK and the wartime experiences of the RN, which was freely shared with the USN, prior to its entry into the war, allowing it to anticipate the changes needed to prepare its carriers for the coming conflict with Japan. The USN designed the armoured flight decks of the Midway-class carriers based upon an analysis of the effectiveness of RN armoured flight decks. The IJN also benefited from being able to observe the effectiveness of RN aircraft carriers in action, while both the USN and IJN were able to introduce new aircraft types, prior to their entry into World War II.

Aircraft restrictions
All RN fleet carriers had  hangar heights, except the two Implacable-class ships, which had  heights, and Indomitable which had a  lower hangar and a  upper hangar. Within the confines of ship design, and the Second London Naval Treaty to which they complied, the Indomitable and Implacable-class carriers had to accept a reduction in hangar heights (to keep the metacentric height within acceptable limits without exceeding the treaty restrictions on overall displacement) and size, and as a result, had some restriction on aircraft types supplied via Lend-Lease. The USN  had  hangar heights while the Yorktown, Wasp, Essex, and Midway classes had  hangar heights.

Defences
The British approach of armoured flight decks was meant as an effective form of passive defence from bombs and kamikaze attacks that actually struck their carriers, while the American carriers primarily relied on fighters to prevent the carriers from being hit in the first place. In addition, RN carriers such as Ark Royal or Illustrious had far heavier anti-aircraft (AA) outfits than their USN counterparts, up to the introduction of the USN Essex-class carriers. Ark Royal, in 1940, carried 16 x 4.5-inch guns, 32 x 40mm "Pom-pom" and 32 x 0.5 inch 0.5 inch Vickers machine guns against 8 x 5-inch, 16 x 28 mm and 24 x .5-inch guns for Enterprise, in 1940. "In wartime, however, the US Navy found the armoured carriers fascinating. After having examined HMS Formidable in 1940, the US naval attaché commented that, were he crossing the Pacific, he would prefer her to a Yorktown, the closest US equivalent, on the basis that she might carry fewer aircraft, but she would be much more likely to get there". Late in the war when the USN operated many carriers together and had improved radar, their fighter and AA defence was reasonably effective, yet both conventional and kamikaze attacks were still able to penetrate USN defences. Bunker Hill and Franklin nearly succumbed to them in 1945. The larger air groups (80–110 planes, vs. 52–81 for late war British ships of the Implacable-class) allowed for a more effective combat air patrol (CAP) without reducing strike capability, improving the protection of the whole battle group and lessening the workload of the carrier escorts. Carrier fighters were able to shoot down far more kamikaze aircraft than any amount of deck armour would have protected against showing the value of absolute numbers, but in the early war period IJN aircraft had little difficulty in penetrating USN CAPs; near the end of the war, veteran American fighter pilots in superior Grumman F6F Hellcat and F4U Corsair fighters were able to defeat the young, inexperienced and ill-trained kamikaze pilots with ease and run up huge kill scores but attackers were still able to get through. (In addition to larger aircraft complements, the US Navy had larger fleets and more resources, so they could establish destroyer pickets as part of their "Big blue blanket" defense system, and develop dedicated AAW ships such as the  antiaircraft cruisers which would have also drawn attention away from the carriers.) On the surface, the record seems balanced.

British naval historian D.K. Brown put the practical difference between American and British design philosophies in no uncertain terms: "More fighters would have been better protection than armour," but that British designs were good for the circumstances in which they were meant to be used. Yet, even , Britain's newest carrier prior to World War II, never operated close to her theoretical aircraft capacity. Prior to the development of effective radar and high speed monoplane fighters, a successful fighter defence was extremely unlikely for any navy thus calling into doubt D.K. Brown's conclusions. The benefits of flight deck armour were intended to counter these issues.

Fewer aircraft meant a lower priority to attack than the more heavily armed American carriers and the RN's operational doctrine dictated smaller airgroups, and the armoured hangar carriers had smaller avgas and ammunition supplies to match. However, RN carriers carried far more aircraft later in the war, making use of the deck park when they adopted USN style operational doctrine. The 2nd generation RN armoured carriers, Indomitable and the Implacable class which had an additional half length lower hangar, were considerably less outmatched by their USN counterparts in the numbers of aircraft operated. The RN operating in harsher weather protected their aircraft from the elements and did not use a permanent deck park in the earlier part of the war.

Damage analysis
US carriers and their fighters shot down more than 1,900 suicide aircraft during Operation Kikusui (the last and largest kamikaze attack in the Okinawa campaign), versus a mere 75 for the British, yet both forces suffered the same number of serious hits (four), on their carriers. However the kamikazes made 173 strikes against other USN targets and the 4 USN carriers suffered a massive death toll, in contrast to the relatively light casualties on the RN carriers.
 
The kamikaze threat overall was serious, but Allied defences neutralised it, and many kamikaze strikes missed the deck armour entirely, or bounced off the decks of both British or American carriers. In some cases, kamikazes either struck glancing blows that did only superficial damage that was fixed within minutes or hours, or missed entirely, due to the poor training and poorer flight experience of their pilots. The majority of kamikazes that did inflict harm caused no more damage than they would have against smaller ships. After a successful kamikaze hit, the British were able to clear the flight deck and resume flight operations in just hours, while their American counterparts often could do the same, but not always; in some cases repairs took a few days or even months. The USN liaison officer on  commented: "When a kamikaze hits a U.S. carrier it means 6 months of repair at Pearl [Harbor]. When a kamikaze hits a Limey carrier it’s just a case of "Sweepers, man your brooms."”

American carriers of the Essex class suffered very high casualties from serious kamikaze hits, though all did survive. The ships were most vulnerable during the period just prior to and during the launching of strikes. Early versions of the design also had a unified ventilation system that would transfer smoke and heat from the hangar deck to the lower decks in the event of a fire. While not a kamikaze attack  was attacked by a dive bomber and struck by two  bombs, one semi-armour piercing (SAP) and one general purpose (GP), when she had 47 aircraft preparing for a strike on Honshu. Both bombs penetrated into her hangar and set off ordnance and fuel from ruptured aircraft tanks for a planned ground attack relying on GP bombs and Tiny Tim missiles, killing 724 personnel.  was severely damaged by pair of kamikaze hits during preparations for an attack on Okinawa which killed 346 men. Each of these USN carriers suffered more casualties than all the British RN armoured carriers combined, illustrating the life saving features of RN carrier design. Illustrious, which had the highest toll, suffered 126 fatal casualties and 84 wounded when hit by six 1100 lb bombs on 10 January 1941.

Paul Silverstone in US warships of World War II notes regarding US carriers that,'vast damage was often caused by suicide planes (Kamikaze) crashing through the wooden flight decks into the hangar below'. Whereas in British carriers 'the steel flight decks showed their worth against kamikaze attacks.'

The only Allied carriers lost to a deck hit was the American  light carrier,  and  escort carrier . Indeed, many light and escort carriers were unarmoured, with no protection on the hangar or flight deck, and thus they fared poorly against deck hits.

Postwar analysis
What was not discovered until late in the war was that the kamikaze impacts proved to have a long-term effect on the structural integrity of some British carriers. Their postwar life was shortened, as the RN had a surplus of carriers with many in shipyards being constructed. The USN rebuilt carriers such as Franklin that had been completely gutted and the crew decimated by IJN attacks.  was an excellent example of this; while she weathered a severe kamikaze hit in 1945 which cratered her deck armour, the hit caused severe internal structural damage and permanently warped the hull (damage worsened in a postwar aircraft-handling accident wherein a Vought Corsair rolled off a lift and raked the hangar deck with 20mm cannon fire, causing a severe fire; but plans to rebuild her as per Victorious were abandoned due to budget cuts, not structural damage, and she lingered in reserve until 1956 before being towed off to the breakers. However, no citation is ever given for this accident which appears to be a distorted fabrication of Formidable's 18 May 1945, hangar fire. She carried no air group post war, and never carried the 20 mm Corsair. The Royal Navy planned to rebuild most of the armoured carriers in the early postwar period:

Illustrious suffered a similar battering, especially off of Malta in 1941 when hit by German dive bombers and late in the war was limited to 22 knots (41 km/h) because her centreline shaft was disabled due to accumulated wartime damage; she spent five years as a training and trials carrier (1948–53) and was disposed of in 1954. Indomitable was completely refit to like-new condition, only to suffer a severe gasoline explosion on board, which caused "considerable structural and electrical damage to the ship". Indomitable was refitted between 1948 and 1950 and served as flagship of the Home Fleet then served a tour of duty in the Mediterranean, where she was damaged by the petrol explosion. She was partially repaired before proceeding under her own power to Queen Elizabeth II's 1953 Coronation Review, before being placed in reserve in 1954. Indomitable was scrapped in 1956. The explosion which occurred on Indomitables hangar deck, while severe, would also have caused severe casualties and extensive damage to an Essex-class carrier, several of which returned to service after hangar explosions, primarily due to the USN's considerable financial and material resources.

Another factor is the advantage in resources that the US Navy had over the Royal Navy. The numerous and capacious American yards on the East and West Coasts allowed the US Navy to build and repair carriers at a more leisurely pace while producing ships collectively at a furious rate. The British with their strained facilities were forced to rush repairs (indeed the overloaded British shipyards had forced some vessels to be sent to the US for repairs) and some ships such as Illustrious, were forced into service even though not fully repaired. The RN was in a state of continual contraction after WWII, and simply did not have the resources or inclination to repair ships that it could no longer man.

Midway and Forrestal classes
While flight-deck-level armour was eventually adopted by the Americans for the  design, the strength deck remained on the hangar level. Midway had originally been planned to have a very heavy gun armament (8-inch weapons). The removal of these weapons freed up enough tonnage to add  of armour at the flight deck level. While this made a great deal of sense from an air group perspective, the Midway ships sat very low in the water for carriers (due to their much greater displacement), certainly much lower than the smaller Essex-class carriers, and had a great deal of difficulty operating in heavy seas. Flight deck armoured ships almost universally (except for the Midway class as completed) possessed a hurricane bow, where the bows were sealed up to the flight deck; wartime experience demonstrated that ships with the hurricane bow configuration (also including the American Lexington class) shipped less water than ships with an open bow. Late-life refits to Midway to bulge her hull and improve freeboard instead gave her a dangerously sharp roll, and made flight operations difficult even in moderate seas. This was therefore not repeated on Coral Sea (Franklin D. Roosevelt had been decommissioned years earlier). After the war, most of the Essex-class ships were modified with a hurricane bow and in the case of Oriskany the wooden flight deck surface was replaced with aluminium for improved resistance against the blast of jet engines, making them appear to have armoured flight decks, but in fact their armour remained at hangar level.

The supercarriers of the postwar era, starting with the  — nearly  longer and  wider in the beam than their World War II counterparts – would eventually be forced to move the strength deck up to the flight deck level as a result of their great size; a shallow hull of those dimensions became too impractical to continue. The issue of protection had no influence on the change; the Forrestal class had an armoured flight deck of at least 1.5" thickness. Some of the follow-on classes to the Forrestals also had armoured flight decks although deck armour is of little to no use against modern anti-ship missiles, it may help limit the damage from flight deck explosions. The experience of World War II caused the USN to change their design policy in favour of armoured flight decks:

References

External links 
 Armoured aircraft carrier action and damage reports, 1940–1945
 Were Armored Flight Decks on British Carriers Worthwhile?
 DEBUNKING SLADE AND WORTH'S ARMOURED CARRIER ESSAYS
 CV13 War Damage Report

Naval architecture
Naval armour
Military comparisons
Aircraft carriers